Big Pig was an Australian funk, rock and pop band that existed from 1985 to 1991. An early line-up was Sherine Abeyratne on lead vocals and percussion (ex-Editions, Bang); Tony Antoniades on vocals and harmonica; Neil Baker on drums; Nick Disbray on vocals and percussion; Tim Rosewarne on vocals and keyboards (ex-Bang); Adrian Scaglione on drums; and Oleh Witer on vocals and percussion (ex-Bang). They issued two albums, Bonk (May 1988) and You Lucky People (15 November 1990), on the White Label Records imprint of Mushroom Records.

Bonk reached No. 5 on the Kent Music Report. In New Zealand, it peaked at No. 2. On the Kent Music Report they had three top 50 singles with "Hungry Town" (October 1986) which peaked at No. 18, "Breakaway" (February 1988) at No. 8, and "Big Hotel" (July) at No. 40. In New Zealand, "Breakaway" was a number-one hit, while "Hungry Town" and "Big Hotel" both reached the top 30. At the ARIA Music Awards of 1987, Big Pig were nominated for Best New Talent and Best Video for "Hungry Town" by Julie Stone Productions, and they won Best Cover Artist for their debut self-titled extended play (May 1986) by Witer.

History

1984-1985: Formation
In 1984, Big Pig was formed in London by visiting Australian drummer, Oleh Witer (ex-Scratch Record Scratch, Bang), with a variable line-up of eight or nine drummers.

Inspired by a performance of Japanese taiko drummers, Witer formed Big Pig: "When I saw them, the key to it was orchestration – that each guy had his own part. There was no improvisation at all. So from that point on, I knew how to do it. It was just a matter of getting the right people". The initial incarnation involved eight or nine drummers with Witer trying to sing over the poly-rhythmic din, while members of the band came and went. At an early gig Witer's former bandmate, Sherine Abeyratne, attended and subsequently joined the ensemble. As a vocalist, she had been a member of various groups: Grand Wazoo, The Editions, Bang, Big Choir, Bob Starkie Shape Up, Gospel Truth, Jo Jo Zep Band, Black Coffee, Dianna Boss and The Extremes, and The Rock Party. In 1988, Sherine recalled "I started joining bands eight years ago, as long as the music was high-energy, really strong, that was the criterion". She had also toured with INXS as a backing vocalist. Another early member was Nick Disbray on vocals and percussion.

Witer and Sherine were previously together in a Melbourne-based band, Bang, which Australian musicologist, Ian McFarlane, described as playing "Grace Jones-styled funk". Witer wanted an edgier, more experimental sound that also retained Bang's funky rhythms and, when his visa ran out, he returned to Melbourne. Late in 1985, Big Pig consisted of Abeyratne on lead vocals and percussion, Tony Antoniades on vocals and harmonica, Neil Baker on drums, Disbray on vocals and percussion, Tim Rosewarne on vocals and keyboards (also ex-Scratch Record Scratch and then Bang with Witer), Adrian Scaglione on drums, and Witer on vocals and percussion. McFarlane felt the new group's sound used a "more avant-funk-meets-disco route while still retaining a feel for pop economy".

1986: Big Pig
Big Pig made its concert debut in February 1986 and soon recorded a self-financed, independently distributed three-track, self-titled extended play, which was released in May. It was co-produced by Etienne Conod and Big Pig. Two of its tracks were "Hungry Town" and "Money God". They signed with Mushroom Records' imprint White Label Records, which re-released their debut EP in October as a double-12" with bonus dance mixes of "Hungry Town" and "Money God". In November that year, Polyanna Sutton of The Canberra Times reported that the group had postponed plans to return to London pending interest from the United States. Antoniades told her "The dance mixes are just for clubs, really. The other thing is: say it did well on the American club scene, it is a strong inroad into cracking some of the American market". Sutton noted that as they "do not use guitars there is a strong reliance on the harmonica to fulfill what the lead guitar would do, playing either riffs or solos".

"Hungry Town" peaked at No. 18 on the Australian Kent Music Report Singles Chart. In March the following year it reached No. 22 in New Zealand. Witer won an award for Best Cover Artist for the artwork on the Big Pig EP at the first ARIA Music Awards of 1987. They were also nominated for ARIA Award for Best New Talent and ARIA Award for Best Video for "Hungry Town" by Julie Stone Productions. The video was directed by Richard Lowenstein (INXS, Hunters & Collectors) and was filmed by Andrew de Groot at a Melbourne dance club.

1987-1989: Bonk 
Their debut studio album, Bonk, was recorded at Metropolis Studios in Melbourne, Rhinoceros Studios in Sydney and Townhouse Studios in London, in 1987, with producer Nick Launay (Public Image Ltd, Midnight Oil, Models).  Bonk was mixed in London later that year and issued in May 1988.

Bonk reached No. 5 on the Australian Kent Music Report Albums Chart It went platinum in Australia. Due to their dominant use of drums, harmonica and vocals, along with the absence of guitars, the band established a unique place in Australian music. Sounding unlike contemporary groups, they also adopted their signature look wearing black waterproof aprons, similar to those worn by blacksmiths, which gave their stage presence a distinctly industrial feel. The group toured the US in May where Justin Mitchell for The Spokesman-Review noted that "Although five of the members sing, vocalist Sherine (no last name) and harp player [Antoniades] handle most of the front work".

The album provided three singles, the Chuck Jackson cover "Breakaway" which reached No. 8 (February 1988), "Big Hotel" (June) No. 40, and "Iron Lung" (December). In the US, Bonk was released by A&M Records in March 1988 and peaked at No. 93 on the Billboard 200 with "Breakaway" reaching No. 60 on the Billboard Hot 100 Singles Chart, and No. 7 on the related Dance Music/Club Play Singles chart. "Money God" was used as the theme for the BBC-TV's DEF IIs Rough Guides show with Magenta Devine hosting, whilst tracks from Bonk were used for Miami Vice episodes in the late 1980s. "Hungry Town" and "Boy Wonder" both featured in the 1988 Yahoo Serious film, Young Einstein. "Breakaway" was used in the opening sequence of comedy-road film, Bill & Ted's Excellent Adventure (1989).

1990-1991: You Lucky People 
Big Pig's second album, You Lucky People, was produced by Hawk Wolinski and Daddy-O, and released on 15 November 1990. Witer told Shane Walker of The Canberra Times that "At the end of our Bonk episode we took time out to rest before spending a lot of time on writing ... this album has been more of a band effort, with everyone chipping in ... we're still searching for and evolving the possibilities there are in our instrumentation". Walker felt the album was "more subtle and rounded" showcasing their "blend of thumping bass, strong vocals, blues harmonica and, of course multitudinous drummers".

Fellow journalist Penelope Layland opined that You Lucky People showed a "simple, funky rhythm threading its way through the tracks, but a sprinkle of other sounds have found their way into the picture, a smattering of harmonica and a deft, sparing dose of keyboards". They toured in support of the album, then in February 1991, Big Pig played for the last time at Melbourne's Sidney Myer Music Bowl. They issued a single, "King of Nothing", on 18 March 1991 and disbanded soon after.

1991-present: Afterwards 
Disbray played some gigs with Caitlin Reilly in 1991 and by 1994 had released his debut solo album, Yep!.

Late in 1994, Tim Rosewarne joined Chocolate Starfish but these days plays keyboards in the Absolutely 80's show which features Scott Carne, Sean Kelly, David Sterry, Brian Mannix, Ally Fowler, Tottie Goldsmith, Dale Ryder, and others performing their hits.  Witer is a visual artist whose paintings have been exhibited in galleries across Australia. He also composed music for the 1996 Australian film, Love and Other Catastrophes.

Mushroom Records re-released "Hungry Town" in June 1998 to celebrate the label's 25th anniversary.

In 2007, "Breakaway" was covered by US House Diva Inaya Day.

"Hungry Town" featured in the first episode of Channel 9's, Underbelly: The Golden Mile on 12 April 2010.

Members
 Sherine Abeyratne — lead vocals, percussion
 Tony Antoniades — vocals, harmonica
 Neil Baker — drums
 Nick Disbray — vocals, percussion
 Tim Rosewarne — vocals, keyboards
 Adrian Scaglione — drums
 Oleh Witer — vocals, drums, percussion

Other associations
 Rosewarne: Scratch Record Scratch, Red=Blue=Yellow, Bang, Big Choir, Flares, Crawling Kingsnakes, Chocolate Starfish, 21/20
 Abeyratne: Grand Wazoo Band of 1000 Dances, The Editions, Bang, Big Choir, Bob Starkie Shape Up, Gospel Truth, Jo Jo Zep Band, Black Coffee, Dianna Boss and The Extremes, The Rock Party, Mercy Mercy, Sherine, Sherine's X Machine
 Witer: Scratch Record Scratch, Bang
 Baker: Crawling Kingsnakes, Convenience Store

Discography

Studio albums

Extended plays

Singles

Soundtrack appearances

Awards

ARIA Music Awards
The ARIA Music Awards is an annual awards ceremony that recognises excellence, innovation, and achievement across all genres of Australian music. It commenced in 1987, Big Pig have won one award from five nominations.

|-
| rowspan="3"| 1987
| rowspan="2"| "Hungry Town"
| ARIA Award for Best New Talent
| 
|-
| ARIA Award for Best Video
| 
|-
| Big Pig
| ARIA Award for Best Cover Art
| 
|-
| rowspan="2"| 1989
| Bonk
| ARIA Award for Album of the Year
| 
|-
| "Big Hotel"
| ARIA Award for Best Video
| 
|-

Countdown Australian Music Awards
Countdown was an Australian pop music TV series on national broadcaster ABC-TV from 1974–1987. It presented music awards from 1979–1987, initially in conjunction with magazine TV Week. The TV Week / Countdown Awards were a combination of popular-voted and peer-voted awards.

|-
| rowspan="3" |1986
| "Hungry Town"
| Best Debut Single
| 
|-
| rowspan="3" | themselves
| Best Debut Act
| 
|-
| Most Promising New Talent
| 
|-

References

External links
Small photo of Big Pig from Artist Direct

ARIA Award winners
Australian rock music groups
Victoria (Australia) musical groups
Musical groups established in 1985
Musical groups disestablished in 1991
1985 establishments in Australia
1991 disestablishments in Australia